Trowbridge is the county town of Wiltshire, England. 

Trowbridge may also refer to:

People
 Trowbridge (surname)

Places

Canada
 Trowbridge, Ontario

United Kingdom
 Trowbridge, Cardiff, Wales

United States
 Trowbridge, California
 Trowbridge Park, Michigan
 Trowbridge Township, Michigan

Other uses
 Trowbridge & Livingston, an architectural practice in New York City in the early 20th century
 Trowbridge Archeological Site, Kansas City, Kansas, United States
 Trowbridge House, historic house in Washington, D.C., United States
 Trowbridge's shrew

See also 
 Charles Trowbridge House, the oldest known structure in the city of Detroit
 Trubridge, a surname
 Troubridge (disambiguation)